The Lincoln Highway Bridge is located in Tama, Iowa, United States, along the historic Lincoln Highway. The Steel stringer bridge was built in 1914, and it was listed on the National Register of Historic Places in 1978. The bridge is noteworthy for its distinctive railings. Local boosters of the Lincoln Highway paid for the railings as a way of promoting the roadway. The bridge was designed by the Iowa Highway Commission and built by Paul N. Kingsley, a contractor from Strawberry Point, Iowa.

See also
List of bridges documented by the Historic American Engineering Record in Iowa

References

External links

360 view of the Lincoln Highway Bridge in Tama, IA

Bridges completed in 1914
Historic American Engineering Record in Iowa
National Register of Historic Places in Tama County, Iowa
Road bridges on the National Register of Historic Places in Iowa
Bridges in Tama County, Iowa
Lincoln Highway
Steel bridges in the United States
Tama, Iowa